"Try a Little Tenderness" is a song written by Jimmy Campbell, Reg Connelly, and Harry M. Woods.

Original version
It was first recorded on December 8, 1932, by the Ray Noble Orchestra, with vocals by Val Rosing. Another version, also recorded in 1932, was made by Charlie Palloy & his Orchestra. Ted Lewis (Columbia 2748 D) and Ruth Etting (Melotone 12625) had hits with it in 1933. Bing Crosby also recorded it on January 9, 1933, for Brunswick Records. A version by Bob and Alf Pearson was also released in 1933. The song appeared on Frank Sinatra's debut album, The Voice of Frank Sinatra, in 1946.

Otis Redding version

A popular version in an entirely new form was recorded by soul artist Otis Redding in 1966. Redding was backed on his version by Booker T. & the M.G.'s, and Stax staff producer Isaac Hayes worked on the arrangement. Redding's recording features a slow, soulful opening that eventually builds into a frenetic R&B conclusion, incorporating elements from the Duke Ellington–Lee Gaines song "Just Squeeze Me (But Please Don't Tease Me)" as well as the words "sock it to me." In early 1967, it peaked at number 25 on the Billboard Hot 100. It has been named on a number of "best songs of all time" lists, including those from the Rock and Roll Hall of Fame. It is in the 136th position on Rolling Stone'''s list of the 500 greatest songs of all time as of the list's 2021 update. A live version performed in 1967 at the Monterey International Pop Festival was also recorded.

In the 1991 Irish film, The Commitments, the band performs the song in the style of Otis Redding. The version by The Commitments reached No. 13 in the Irish chart. Redding's version was also sampled in the song "Otis", recorded by rappers Jay-Z and Kanye West, from their album Watch the Throne. Additionally, it appears in the film Pretty in Pink, and was sung briefly by Eddie Murphy as Donkey in Shrek. D-TV set the Otis Redding version to Cinderella.

Charts

Certifications

Three Dog Night version
Three Dog Night released a version of the song, which peaked at number 29 on the US Billboard Top 100 in 1969, and number 19 in Canada. It borrows stylistically from Redding's interpretation of the song, including the coda that was added in Redding's version.

Dr. Strangelove
An instrumental version of the song is played during the opening credits of the 1964 film Dr. Strangelove'' over authentic footage of in-flight refueling of a U.S. Air Force B-52 bomber.

References

1932 songs
1966 singles
1969 singles
Songs written by Harry M. Woods
Songs written by Jimmy Campbell and Reg Connelly
Otis Redding songs
Frank Sinatra songs
Etta James songs
Aretha Franklin songs
Three Dog Night songs
Atco Records singles